This is the list of episodes for The Late Late Show with James Corden in 2023.

2023
January

February

March

References

External links 
 

 
Lists of variety television series episodes
2023-related lists